Operation Pelikan, also known as Projekt 14, was a German plan for crippling the Panama Canal during World War II. In mid-late 1943 the Wehrmacht had completed preparations to haul two Ju 87 Stukas with folding wings on two U-boats to an unnamed Colombian island near the coast of Panama, reassemble the planes, arm them with "special bombs", and then send them to attack the Gatun Dam. After completing the mission, the pilots would fly to a neutral country and seek internment. However, Germany called off the plan, for unknown reasons, at the last minute. Rumors among the Germans who planned the sabotage were that it had been called off due to betrayal.

Most of these types of plans involved acts of sabotage using agents in place and/or landed by U-boat.

See also
 Panama during World War II
 Colombia during World War II
 Panama Canal strike
 Operation Bolivar

References

World War II espionage
Military history of Germany during World War II
Military history of Panama during World War II
Military history of the United States during World War II
1943 in Germany
1943 in Colombia
Nazis in South America